Wolfgang Grams (March 6, 1953 – June 27, 1993) was a member of the Red Army Faction (RAF), a German far-left terrorist organisation.

Life

Wolfgang Grams was born in Wiesbaden, Germany. His parents, Werner and Ruth Grams, were expelled from the east.  Werner Grams volunteered for service in the Waffen-SS. They had another son, Rainer.

During Grams' younger years, his family lived near the Wiesbaden Army Airfield, and he demonstrated against the Vietnam War.

While living in a commune, he was given the nickname Gaks. After the arrest of Andreas Baader and Gudrun Ensslin, he started visiting RAF prisoners in jail. He found the conditions of solitary confinement inhumane.

Grams' name was found in a note book of an RAF terrorist who was killed during an arrest attempt. He was kept in custody for 153 days, but was given remuneration in 1980. He then met Birgit Hogefeld, and they began dating and moved in together.

On February 15, 1987, the Tagesschau on ARD ran a bulletin on Grams and Hogefeld. From 1984 on he lived underground. Only in the Autumn of 1990 did he come home to meet with his parents in Taunus.

Later DNA evidence connects Gram to the killing of Detlev Karsten Rohwedder in 1991.

Death
On June 27, 1993, members of the GSG 9 were to arrest Grams and Hogefeld at the train station in Bad Kleinen. During the process of the arrest, he managed to pull a gun and shoot two officers, succeeding in killing one, Michael Newrzella. Officers were quoted as saying they saw Grams "suddenly fall backward" off the station platform and onto the track. Either before or after he fell, he allegedly shot himself in the head. He was taken to the Medizinische Universität zu Lübeck by helicopter where he died from his wounds a few hours later.

Shortly after the operation there were allegations that Grams had not shot himself but was executed with a shot in the head from close range by a GSG 9 officer. The Staatsanwaltschaft Schwerin investigated these allegations and concluded in January 1994 that these allegations were incorrect. Grams' parents challenged this conclusion in court, but it was upheld by five different courts, including the European Court of Human Rights in 1999.

Interior Minister Rudolf Seiters took responsibility for the poor conducting and postprocessing of the operation and resigned in July of the year, as well as Chief Federal Prosecutor, Alexander von Stahl.  Helmut Kohl paid a visit to the unit, praising Newrzella and discouraged "attempts to make a martyr of his murderer."

In popular culture
The award-winning 2001 German documentary movie Black Box BRD retells the lives and deaths of Wolfgang Grams and Alfred Herrhausen, a German banker in whose assassination Grams is suspected of having been involved.
The incident has been widely criticised in German punk rock songs such as Kopfschuss ("head shot") by WIZO, Bad K. by Dritte Wahl or Gewalt ("violence") by Slime.

References

1953 births
1993 deaths
German murderers
People from Wiesbaden
Suicides by firearm in Germany
Members of the Red Army Faction
Death conspiracy theories